TV Palma Plus was a privately owned Serbian television station based in Jagodina.

External links

Television stations in Serbia